Queens Road Baptist Church is a Baptist church located in the city centre of Coventry, England. The chapel is a grade II listed building.

History
The congregation of Queens Road Baptist Church have a continuous history that can be traced back to 1643. In 1643 the congregation of the two parish churches located within Coventry decided they would like a more biblical style of church. From this a number of issues arose surrounding the baptism of believers and consequently a 'Baptized Church of Christ' arose.

In 1723 the first church was built for the congregation, prior to this the congregation met to worship in houses. John Butterworth, who was Minister at the time (1753 - 1803) developed and grew the church till it moved into a larger premises in Cow Lane.

In 1884, the Minister William Henderson, moved the church's worship into the current building on Queens Road. A deacon at the church, John Worwood, owned a carpentry and building business and was the builder of the church as appointed by the Building Committee in February 1882 to build the church on commission.

In 1931 a new, prominent, Minister began at the church. He was called Howard Ingli James and influenced many people in Coventry because of his political campaigning for social justice and welfare. He renounced war and was the reason behind many members of Queens Road to become conscientious objectors during the war.

In the 1970s Queens Road had its most dynamic Minister in Richard Hamper, JP. Richard and his wife Madeline sought to encourage youth inclusion in the society of the church, whilst enabling a strong understanding of the Christian message. His role as a JP was driven by a sense of social justice without prejudice.

The church changed again after 1980 whilst David Spriggs was Minister, he began various evangelical programmes with the co-operation of other various churches within the area. In 2007 Grenville Overton was Minister and he oversaw the extension and refurbishment of the church.

References

External links
 Queens Road Baptist Church website

Churches in Coventry